Lucky Rabbit may refer to:
Oswald the Lucky Rabbit, a cartoon character and the cartoon itself
El conejo de la suerte, a Spanish singing game, or the name of the song
Lucky rabbit charm
"Lucky Rabbit", a character from the Lucky Town designed by Susumu Matsushita